Floridsdorf  is a station on  of the Vienna U-Bahn. It is located in the Floridsdorf District, underneath Wien Floridsdorf railway station, which is also served by Vienna S-Bahn lines S1, S2, S3 and S7. It opened in 1996.

References

Buildings and structures in Floridsdorf
Railway stations opened in 1996
1996 establishments in Austria
Vienna U-Bahn stations
Railway stations in Austria opened in the 20th century

de:U-Bahn-Station Floridsdorf